Centaurea hyalolepis is a species of plants in the family Asteraceae.

Sources

References 

hyalolepis
Flora of Malta